The 1955 Southern Area League was the second season of the regional third tier of speedway racing in the United Kingdom for Southern British teams. The season started with the same five teams that finished the previous season.

Rye House Roosters were the champions. Vic Hall of Brafield topped the averages.

Ringwood Turfs withdrew mid-season.

Final table

Withdrawal (Record expunged) : Ringwood Turfs

Leading Averages

See also
List of United Kingdom Speedway League Champions
Knockout Cup (speedway)

References

Southern Area League
1955 in speedway